The G-class submarines were a class of four United States Navy submarines. While the four G boats were nominally all of a class, they differed enough in significant details that they are sometimes considered to be four unique boats, each in a class by herself. They were the result of agitation (presumably from industry and Congress) for competition in submarine design; all previous US submarines were designed by Electric Boat. G-1, G-2, and G-3 were designed by Simon Lake of the Lake Torpedo Boat Company, while G-4 was designed by American Laurenti. G-1 was built by Newport News, G-2 and G-3 by Lake (completed at the New York Navy Yard due to Lake's temporary dissolution), and G-4 by Cramp.

Design
G-1, G-2, and G-4 were the last gasoline-powered submarines in the US Navy. The Lake-designed G-1 was equipped with three sets of diving planes spaced along the midships part of the hull, and no bow planes. This was to facilitate level diving, which Lake thought was safer than the angle diving of the numerous Electric Boat designs. During World War I, G-1 and G-2 were fitted with "chariot" bridge shields for improved surface operation in rough weather, although they were not deployed overseas.

By the time the Navy's designation system was overhauled in 1920, F-1 had been lost, so G-1 became SS-20 at that time. G-1 had six 18 inch (450 mm) torpedo tubes: two in the bow, and four in two twin trainable mounts in the superstructure. These mounts could only fire abeam, not dead ahead or dead astern.

G-2 had four 18-inch torpedo tubes: two bow internal, one bow external, and one stern external, with 8 torpedoes. She was the first US submarine with a stern tube. A preliminary drawing shows four engines installed, in tandem, probably with a clutch between them. This would likely create severe vibrations in operation, as it would be impossible to perfectly synchronize the engines, a problem the later s experienced.

G-3 had six 18-inch torpedo tubes: two bow internal, two bow external, and two stern external, with 10 torpedoes. She was the only one of the class with diesel engines. While being completed at the Brooklyn Navy Yard she was fitted with sponsons to improve stability.

G-4 had two bow and two stern 18-inch internal torpedo tubes, with 8 torpedoes. Four engines were installed, in tandem as in G-2, except there was no clutch between them. This created severe vibrations in operation, as it was impossible to perfectly synchronize the engines, a problem the later AA-1 class experienced.

Ships
  (originally Seal) was laid down on 2 February 1909, launched as Seal on 8 February 1911, but renamed G-1 on 17 November 1911. She was commissioned on 28 October 1912. Decommissioned 6 March 1920, redesignated SS-20 that year. Sunk as a target near Taylor's Point, Narragansett Bay, Rhode Island by  21 June 1921. The wreck may still exist.
  (originally Tuna) was laid down on 20 October 1909, renamed G-2 on 17 November 1911 and launched on 10 January 1912. She was commissioned on 1 December 1913, full commissioned on 6 February 1915. Decommissioned 2 April 1919 and used as a target; sank at her moorings in Two Tree Channel, Niantic, Connecticut 30 July 1919. The wreck may still exist.
  (originally Turbot) was laid down on 30 March 1911, renamed G-3 on 17 November 1911 and launched on 27 December 1913. She was commissioned on 22 March 1915. Decommissioned on 5 May 1921 and scrapped in 1922.
  (originally Thrasher) was laid down on 9 July 1910, renamed G-4 on 17 November 1911 and launched on 15 August 1912. She was commissioned on 22 January 1914. Decommissioned on 5 September 1919 and scrapped in 1921.

References

Notes

Sources
 Friedman, Norman "US Submarines through 1945: An Illustrated Design History", Naval Institute Press, Annapolis:1995, .
 Gardiner, Robert, Conway's All the World's Fighting Ships 1906–1921 Conway Maritime Press, 1985. .
 Silverstone, Paul H., U.S. Warships of World War I (Ian Allan, 1970), .
Navsource.org early diesel submarines page
Navsource.org early submarines page
Pigboats.com G-boats page

External links

Submarine classes
 
 G class